Wild Ones were an American dream pop band from Portland, Oregon.

History
Wild Ones began in 2010 with the release of an EP titled You're A Winner. In 2014, they released their first full-length album on Topshelf Records.

In 2015, Wild Ones released an EP titled Heatwave on Topshelf Records.

Band members
Thomas Himes (keyboard)
Danielle Sullivan (vocals)
Max Stein (bass) 
Nick Vicario (guitar)
Seve Sheldon (drums)

Discography
Studio albums
Keep It Safe (2014, Topshelf)
Mirror Touch (2017, Topshelf)

EPs
You're A Winner (2010)
Heatwave (2014, Topshelf)

References

2010 establishments in Oregon
Musical groups from Portland, Oregon
Musical groups established in 2010
Dream pop musical groups
Topshelf Records artists